Lambas may referred to:
Lamba people
Lambas, Russia